Brian Alvarez may refer to:

 Brian Jordan Alvarez (born 1987), American actor and filmmaker
 Bryan Alvarez (born 1975), American wrestler, host, editor and publisher
 Bryan Alvaréz (born 1999), Costa Rican swimmer